In Apple's macOS operating system, Quartz is the  Quartz 2D and Quartz Compositor part of the Core Graphics framework.  Quartz includes both a 2D renderer in Core Graphics and the composition engine that sends instructions to the graphics card. Because of this vertical nature, Quartz is often synonymous with Core Graphics.

In a general sense, Quartz or Quartz technologies can refer to almost every part of the  graphics model from the rendering layer down to the compositor including Core Image and Core Video. Other Apple graphics technologies that use the "Quartz" prefix include these:
 Quartz Extreme
 QuartzGL (originally Quartz 2D Extreme)
 QuartzCore
 Quartz Display Services
 Quartz Event Services

Quartz 2D and Quartz Compositor
Quartz 2D is the primary two-dimensional (2D) text and graphics rendering library:  It directly supports Aqua by displaying two-dimensional graphics to create the user interface, including on-the-fly rendering and anti-aliasing. Quartz can render text with sub-pixel precision; graphics are limited to more traditional anti-aliasing, which is the default mode of operation but can be turned off. In Mac OS X 10.4 Tiger, Apple introduced Quartz 2D Extreme, enabling Quartz 2D to offload rendering to compatible GPUs. However, GPU rendering was not enabled by default due to potential video redraw issues or kernel panics. 
In Mac OS X v10.5 Quartz 2D Extreme was renamed to QuartzGL. However, it still remains disabled by default, as there are some situations where it can degrade performance, or experience visual glitches; it is a per-application setting which can be turned on if the developer wishes.

The Quartz Compositor is the compositing engine used by macOS.  In Mac OS X Jaguar and later, the Quartz Compositor can use the graphics accelerator (GPU) to vastly improve composition performance.  This technology is known as Quartz Extreme and is enabled automatically on systems with supported graphics cards.

Use of PDF
Quartz's internal imaging model correlates well with the PDF object graph, making it easy to output PDF to multiple devices.

See also
Quartz Composer

References

External links
 Quartz 2D Programming Guide at developer.apple.com
 Core Graphics API Reference at developer.apple.com
 Quartz in Tiger (from a review of  10.4 in Ars Technica)
 Introduction to OS X graphics APIs
 Cocoa Graphics with Quartz: Part 1
 Cocoa Graphics with Quartz: Part 2

Graphics software
MacOS